The Rhinophrynidae are a family of frogs containing one extant genus, the monotypic Rhinophrynus, and a number of fossil genera. The family is sometimes known as the Mexican burrowing toads or simply burrowing toads.

Rhinophrynus occurs in the Central America north from Costa Rica to Mexico and Texas. Fossil finds of Rhinophrynidae come from Mexico, the United States, and Canada. Rhinophrynus is a burrowing ant and termite eater.

Systematics
The Rhinophrynidae are the sister taxon of the Pipidae. The clade formed by these two genera is sometimes referred to as Xenoanura or superfamily Pipoidea.

Genera
Extant genera:
 Rhinophrynus or Mexican burrowing toad

Fossil genera:
 †Chelomophrynus Henrici 1991 Wagon Bed Formation, Wyoming United States, Eocene
 †Eorhinophrynus Hecht 1959 Polecat Bench Formation, Wyoming, United States, Paleocene
 †Rhadinosteus Henrici 1998 Morrison Formation, Utah, United States, Late Jurassic

The affinity of Eorhinophrynus is uncertain.

References

 
Amphibian families
Late Jurassic first appearances
Taxa named by Albert Günther